Otamixaban (INN) is an experimental injectable anticoagulant direct factor Xa inhibitor that was investigated for the treatment for acute coronary syndrome.  In 2013, Sanofi announced that it had ended development of the drug candidate after poor performance in a Phase III clinical trial.

References

Direct Xa inhibitors